Control Freq (pronounced "control freek", i.e. freak) is an American musical group.

Description
They are from the Detroit area and were formerly known as Charm Farm. Led by the DJ Static Revenger (a.k.a. Dennis White), their music is considered techno or drum and bass.

Music
Their song, "Satellite", is on AE Mix 1, a promotional album by the American clothing company/retailer American Eagle Outfitters. The song also is featured in the video game Audition Online Dance Battle (Nexon America).

Discography

Albums/EPs
Sweetest Day EP (F111 Records, 1999) 
Freq Show (Warner Bros., 2000)

Singles
"Satellite"
"Sweetest Day"
"Do You Fear Me?"
"We Accept You"
"Welcome to the Freq Show"

Notes and references

External links
Videos featuring Control Freq music at YouTube

American techno music groups